Energen is a cereal mix brand owned by PT Mayora Indah and the Philippines-based Vouno Trade Marketing Services Inc. This brand was fortified with SIGMAvit.

History

Indonesia 
In 1992, Energen was introduced by PT Mayora Indah Tbk. with the flavors Vanilla, Chocolate, Corn, Green Beans and Ginger.

Philippines 
In 2008, Energen was introduced by Ecossential Foods Corporation with the flavors Vanilla and Chocolate. It was followed by Bear Brand Busog Lusog in May, 2008. In 2010, Monggo flavor was introduced, but in 2013 it was discontinued, but remains available in Indonesia. In 2013, Ginger flavor was introduced, but it was discontinued in 2016 and remains available in Indonesia. In 2017, Sweet Corn flavor was introduced and discontinued in 2018.

Variants 
Energen is enriched with SIGMAVit with milk, malt, cereal and oats. In Indonesia, it was manufactured as oat milk (like Quaker Oats). In the Philippines, it was manufactured as a mixture of oat drink and real fruit called Energen Go-Fruit in 2014, though it was discontinued in 2015.

References 

Drink brands
Indonesian brands
Products introduced in 2006
Mayora Indah brands